Ameysford is a village in Dorset, England.

There is an electoral ward of the same name which is a suburb of Ferndown.

Villages in Dorset